Cerastipsocus venosus is a species of common barklouse in the family Psocidae. It is found in the Caribbean Sea, Central America, and North America. Nymphs often move in a tightly packed herd. They feed on lichen.

References

External links

 

Psocidae
Articles created by Qbugbot
Insects described in 1839
Insects of North America